Suresh Kalmadi (born 1 May 1944) is an Indian politician who spent 10 months in jail from April 2011 to January 2012 on corruption charges related to his time in charge of the 2010 Commonwealth Games in Delhi. He was accused of awarding a contract to install the timing, scoring and results system for the event to Swiss Timing at vastly inflated rates. The official, also president of the Indian Olympic Association (IOA) from 1996 to 2012, was charged with conspiracy, forgery and misconduct under the Prevention of Corruption Act but has so far never faced trial. He was formerly a member of the Indian National Congress. He was a member of parliament from Pune until May 2014. He is alleged to have been involved in corrupt practices in relation to the 2010 Commonwealth Games during his tenure as president of Indian Olympic Association and chairman of Commonwealth Games 2010. He was charged with conspiracy, forgery, misconduct and under provisions of the Prevention of Corruption Act and later arrested for the same in April 2014, but as has yet not faced trial. In December 2016, the Indian Olympic Association (IOA) named Suresh Kalmadi as its lifetime patron. However, he refused to accept the post until he was able to clear his name.

Early life 
Kalmadi was born to Mangalore-based Dr. K. Shamrao Kalmadi and Shanta Rao Kalmadi. He speaks Konkani, Kannada, Marathi, English, Hindi and Tulu language. He was educated at St. Vincent's High School and Fergusson College, Pune. Kalmadi joined the National Defence Academy in 1960 and was commissioned as a pilot in the Indian Air Force, serving between 1964 and 1972. He then became an instructor with the Air Force Training Team of the NDA from 1972 to 1974 before retiring from the IAF as a squadron leader.

He is married to Meera Kalmadi. The couple have two daughters and one son.

Political career
In 1977, Kalmadi became the president of the Indian Youth Congress, Pune, and the next year took over President-ship of the Youth Congress, Maharashtra, a post he held from 1978 to 1980. In 1980, as the president of the Maharashtra Athletics Association, Kalmadi undertook the selection trials for the Marathon team to represent the country at the Moscow Olympics. This soon led to the establishment of the Pune International Marathon.

Kalmadi served as president of the Indian Youth Congress (Socialist) 19811986.

He was a member of the Rajya Sabha for three terms from 1982 to 1996, and again in 1998.

Kalmadi took over as the Chairman of the Maharashtra Tourism Development Corporation and in 1989 started the Pune Festival.

He was also elected to the 11th Lok Sabha in 1996, and to the 14th Lok Sabha in 2004. During the tenure of P. V. Narasimha Rao as the Prime Minister of India, Suresh Kalmadi served as the Minister of State for Railways from 1995 to 1996. That year he presented the Railway Budget.

Kalmadi served as the president of the Indian Olympic Association from 1996 to 2012. He also served as the president of Asian Athletics Association from 2000 to 2013 and was named its Life President in 2015.

Controversies

Corruption related to Formula One 2011
Kalmadi, as the Indian Olympic Association, signed an agreement to bring the Formula One Grand Prix to India in 2007. Later that year, the UK-based organizers Formula One Administration Limited signed a  contract in this regard with India-based JPSK Sports Private Limited. Records obtained by The Indian Express showed that Pune-based Sulba Realty Private Limited was a 13% shareholder in JPSK, along with Jaypee Group (74%). Kalmadi's son Sumeer was a director in Sulba Realty at the time, which would have implied a conflict of interest. While the JP in JPSK stood for Jaypee Group, it was alleged that the SK was a reference to Suresh/Sumeer Kalmadi. Records from the Registrar of Companies, India showed that a year after the company was floated, Kalmadi's daughter, Payal Aditya Bhartia, and his son-in-law, Aditya Bhartia, joined JPSK as independent directors.

Commonwealth Games 2010

Kalmadi's conduct around the 2010 Commonwealth Games came under scrutiny, with the Central Vigilance Commission (India's anti-corruption organisation) asking the Central Bureau of Investigation to probe certain aspects of the games' organisation.
For this, the opposition demanded Kalmadi's resignation.

On 25 April 2011, CBI arrested former CWG Organising Committee (OC) chairman Suresh Kalmadi in the Timing-Scoring-Result (TSR) case. He was arrested under Sections 120 B (criminal conspiracy) and 420 (cheating) of the Indian Penal Code.

On 20 May 2011, CBI filed the first chargesheet in a special CBI court against Kalmadi. The CBI alleged that he was the main accused in awarding TSR system contract to a Swiss firm. The charge sheet said, "Kalmadi is the main accused as he was the person with all supreme powers. He had the supreme over-riding powers in the Organising Committee of the CWG, 2010." In addition to Kalmadi, the CBI named two companies and eight persons including OC former Secretary General Lalit Bhanot and former Director General VK Verma as accused.

Kalmadi's membership of the Indian National Congress Party was suspended after being arrested and charged with corruption. On 26 April 2011 he was sacked from the post of president of the Indian Olympic Association. On 1 July 2013 he lost the election for the post of president of the Asian Athletics Association, a post which he had held for 13 consecutive years, losing to Qatar's Dahlan Jumaan Al-Hamad.

Kalmadi was allowed by a Delhi court on 13 July 2012 to go to London for 2012 Olympics. He was, however, restrained on 25 July 2012 by the Delhi High court from participating in the opening ceremony of the London Olympics, saying his participation can cause "embarrassment" to the nation.

He claimed to be suffering from dementia during course of investigation while in Tihar jail. Medical tests were not conclusive to be able to prove his claim.

References

Indian Air Force officers
1944 births
Living people
Railway Ministers of India
Politicians from Pune
India MPs 2009–2014
Indian sports executives and administrators
Indian National Congress politicians
2010 Commonwealth Games
India MPs 1996–1997
India MPs 2004–2009
Rajya Sabha members from Maharashtra
Inmates of Tihar Jail
Indian prisoners and detainees
Prisoners and detainees of India
Marathi politicians
Lok Sabha members from Maharashtra
People charged with corruption